The Night Before is the seventh studio album of Belgian band Hooverphonic, and the first album with female singer Noémie Wolfs. The album went platinum in Belgium, shortly after the release. The two main singles "The Night Before" and "Anger Never Dies" entered the top five of the Flemish singles chart.

Track listing 
All songs written by Alex Callier, except where noted.

 "Anger Never Dies" – 3:30
 "The Night Before" (Callier, Raymond Geerts) – 2:48
 "Heartbroken" (Callier, Luca Chiaravalli) – 2:47
 "Norwegian Stars" – 3:09
 "More" – 2:36
 "One Two Three" (Callier, Geerts) – 3:00
 "George's Café" – 3:49
 "Identical Twin" (Callier, Cathy Dennis) – 2:38
 "Encoded Love" – 3:28
 "How Can You Sleep" (Callier, Geerts) – 3:50
 "Sunday Afternoon" – 3:25
 "Danger Zone" – 3:06

Chart performance

Weekly charts

Year-end charts

Certifications

References

2010 albums
Hooverphonic albums